The International Star Diamond Tower is a skyscraper office building located in Sanchong District, New Taipei, Taiwan. The building was completed in 1993 and had undergone refurbishment in 2003. When it was first completed in 1993, it was the tallest building in New Taipei (then Taipei County). 

When it was first completed, the building housed a Mazu Temple on its topmost floor called Hong Sheng Temple and was the tallest Mazu Temple in Taiwan. Nevertheless, in November 2011, after several protests by residents of the building, Hong Sheng Temple was moved to lower floors.

See also 
 List of tallest buildings in Taiwan
 List of tallest buildings in New Taipei City

References

1993 establishments in Taiwan
Buildings and structures in New Taipei
Skyscraper office buildings in New Taipei
Office buildings completed in 1993